General Magnaplate is a company that researches and produces surface coatings for metals.

One of its products, Hi-T-Lube, is recognized by the Guinness Book of World Records as the "world's most slippery solid".

Timeline 

1952 — Magnaplate Metal Finishers is established in Hoboken, New Jersey.
1967 — Tufram, Inc. opens in Linden, New Jersey to produce cookware, which is ranked Number 1 in the U.S. two years in a row by Consumer Reports.
1968 — Canadize is invented, a coating that augments surface hardness for titanium and titanium alloys.
1969 — The first man walks on the moon, and thanks to General Magnaplate he was able to drill into the moon's surface. A Canadize treatment on both the inside and outside of the titanium core sample drill tubes prevented samples being contaminated by titanium particles from the drill.
1970 — Nedox was invented, a coating that significantly increases metals' corrosion resistance and wear life.
1980 — General Magnaplate opens its Ventura, California facility.
1982 — General Magnaplate's Texas facility upgrades to its new Arlington location, and Candida Covino joins the company.
1985 — Ed Aversenti joins the company
1986 — Candida Covino becomes president of General Magnaplate and Magnaplate SNS is invented.
1989 — Plasmadize is invented, a coating which combines the advantages of thermal spraying with controlled infusion of dry polymers, dry lubricants or other materials to provide an entirely new composite with improved properties.
1995 — Hi-T-Lube is recognized by the Guinness Book of Records as the solid with the lowest coefficient of friction in the world.
2002 — General Magnaplate celebrates its 50th anniversary
2002 — General Magnaplate obtains ISO 9001 certification 
2004 — General Magnaplate plays a critical role in the Mars rover landing by providing coatings for the landing mechanism.
2007 — Founder Dr. Charles P. Covino dies.

References

Engineering companies of the United States